Joseph Alexander Cuthbert Mehaffy (10 April 1895 – 1970) was an Irish footballer who played in the Football League for New Brighton. He earned one international cap with Ireland in April 1922 against Wales.

References

1895 births
1970 deaths
Association football goalkeepers
English Football League players
Pre-1950 IFA international footballers
Association footballers from Northern Ireland
Belfast Celtic F.C. players
Queen's Island F.C. players
Linfield F.C. players
Everton F.C. players
Glenavon F.C. players
Tottenham Hotspur F.C. players
New Brighton A.F.C. players